Bill Warrington (1910 – September 11, 1981) was a special effects artist.  He won one Academy Award, which was for the film The Guns of Navarone. He shared his win with Chris Greenham, this was in the category of Best Special Effects during the 34th Academy Awards.

He did  special effects on 70 films, with his final film being Raiders of the Lost Ark.

References

External links

1910 births
1981 deaths
Best Visual Effects Academy Award winners
Special effects people